Jahvante Jahqwane Sheldon Smart ( – ), known professionally as Smoke Dawg, was a Canadian rapper, singer and songwriter from Toronto, Ontario. Smoke Dawg was a part of hip hop collective Halal Gang alongside Mustafa the Poet, Puffy L'z, Safe, and Mo-G who come together with the Prime Boys to make the supergroup Full Circle. His debut and only studio album Struggle Before Glory was released posthumously in 2018.

Career

Beginnings: 2012–2014
Smart began rapping at the age of 16 in 2012. He gained recognition in 2014 with the release of "Still" featuring Halal Gang member MoG, released on October 4, 2014. It gained over 1 million views within a month of release. This was two days before close friend Ano died. Mo-G and Smoke Dawg uploaded the song "Still" to YouTube in January 2015. In it, the two rappers and their friends rap, dance, and laugh in shadowy parking lots, fluorescent-lit apartment corridors, and an empty studio. Although the initial upload was deleted, its re-upload amassed over 4 million views within a year of being online.

Trap House: 2015–2016
Smart released the single "Trap House" on July 31, 2016. The single introduced a dance move known as "flippin'" and gained the attention of artists including French Montana, who appeared on the official remix of the single and Toronto artist Drake. Drake went on to include Smart in many of his worldwide tours and he also headlined alongside ASAP Ferg. Safe released the single "Hang" in 2015 which saw a feature from Smoke Dawg. Smart subsequently went on to release the single "Overseas" alongside Skepta in October 2016. This was Skepta's second work with a Canadian artist, the first being Tre Mission. The single was produced by Toronto native Murda Beatz. Smart also performed at Toronto's first independent hip-hop festival outside of OVO's own offering, 6 Fest. The two-day festival saw Smoke Dawg performing alongside his Halal Gang as well as Pusha T, French Montana and Roy Woods.

Struggle Before Glory: 2017–2018
Smart was placed on Nows list of Toronto musicians to watch for in 2017. In February 2017, Smart released the song "Count it Up" where he went to London, UK to shoot the music video. He also headlined in London with supporting acts from Nafe Smallz, Drake and Splurgeboys. Whilst in the UK, Smoke Dawg and Halal Gang affiliate Puffy L'z dropped a "Fire in the Booth" freestyle with Charlie Sloth in March 2017. He was also on the Boy Meets World Tour touring with Drake. During this month Smart also featured on Jimmy Prime's single "Humana" alongside Donnie. Toronto's most notorious music festival, uTOpia, was held during June 2017 and premiered showcase for the new generation of artists in the General Toronto Area. Smoke Dawg who was one of the main performers of the festival brought out Puffy L'z and Mo-G. The event was rated 7 by Exclaim!, who described Prime Boys and Halal Gang's performance as playing off of each other's energy, which ultimately brought the night together. In September 2017, Smart was featured in the documentary "Northside" which highlighted Toronto's fledgling rap scene. Noisey released a short documentary titled "Noisey Meets Smoke Dawg" in December 2017. The behind-the-scenes documentary caught up with Smoke Dawg in Toronto where he talked about his rise, the passing of his best friend, and how to break out of Toronto's glass ceiling.

Smart announced that he was working on his debut studio album  Struggle Before Glory in early 2018. However, before the album was officially released, he was shot and killed on June 30, 2018, in front of a nightclub in downtown Toronto. The lead single of the album "No Discussion" featured AJ Tracey and was produced by Murda Beatz. It was released a month after his death on August 13, 2018. Smoke Dawg's posthumous debut and only studio album Struggle Before Glory was released on November 29, 2018. The album was rated 8/10 by Exclaim!. The album features from the likes of Toronto artists Puffy L'z, Jimmy Prime, Jay Whiss and Safe, as well as UK artists Fredo, AJ Tracey and Giggs. The album was described as a "sum up of the late rapper's legacy". Smoke Dawg's younger brother, Young Smoke, provided a tribute on the outro of the album.

Posthumous appearances and legacy: 2019-present

Halal Gang affiliate Mustafa the Poet released a short film titled Remember Me, Toronto. The film aims to discuss the systemic structure working against the lower economies of Toronto and wanted to give these artists the opportunity to "rewrite their memories and the memories of those they lost". Smart was featured at the start of the clip in archive footage of his speech on how he wishes to be remembered. Smart appeared on Puffy L'z debut album Take No L'z released on July 19, 2019, on the single "Boring" alongside Jay Whiss.
He was also featured on Donnie's debut album From the Beginning to End released on November 22, 2019, on the track "Good as it Gets" alongside Jimmy Prime. 

Jay Whiss released the single "Mind in a Maze", the lead single for his debut album Peace of Mind. The song was a tribute to Smoke Dawg and has stated that it was his favorite song ever recorded. Smart was known for his adlib "Awhooley", in an interview with Now newspaper, Puffy L'z stated he uses the adlib to keep Smart's name alive. Mustafa the Poet dedicated his debut album When Smoke Rises to Smoke Dawg released in 2021. The title of the album is a reference to him as well as featuring Smart on the cover art.

Death
On June 30, 2018, Smart was killed in a shooting in broad daylight in front of a downtown nightclub in the Toronto Entertainment District near the corner of Queen Street West and Spadina Avenue. The perpetrators allegedly shot multiple times and fled in a black SUV with tinted windows. Three victims, including Smoke Dawg, were injured. Two were later pronounced dead in hospital. Affiliates of Smoke Dawg posted on social media that Smoke Dawg and 28-year-old Prime Boys manager Koba Prime (birth name Ernest "Kosi" Modekwe) were killed in the shooting, with the Toronto Police Service confirming this as a fact the following day. Mayor John Tory blamed the shooting on gun violence and as a result met with the 6ixBuzz team and Director X to meet with members of the hip-hop community to talk gun violence solutions and raise awareness on the issue.  It was found that Abdulkadir Handule, who is known by his stage name "21Neat", pled not guilty to two counts of first-degree murder, but was convicted of two counts of second-degree murder by an Ontario Superior Court jury in February 2022.  Handule is currently serving a life sentence.

Discography
Studio albums
 2018: Struggle Before Glory

SongsAs lead artistAs featured artist'

Filmography

References

External links
 

1996 births
2018 deaths
2018 murders in Canada
21st-century Canadian rappers
Black Canadian musicians
Canadian people of Jamaican descent
Canadian male rappers
Murder in Canada
People murdered in Toronto
Deaths by firearm in Ontario
Canadian murder victims
Male murder victims
Rappers from Toronto
21st-century Canadian male musicians
2018 in Ontario